The 2010 Vuelta a Andalucía is the 56th edition of the Vuelta a Andalucía stage race. The previous edition was won by Rabobank's Joost Posthuma. The race started at 21 February and finished at 25 February.

Stages

Stage 1
 21 February 2010, Jaén to Puerto de La Guardia,

Stage 2
 22 February 2010, Otura to Cordoba,

Stage 3
 23 February 2010, Marbella to Benahavis,

Stage 4
 24 February 2010, Malaga (ITT)

Stage 5
 25 February 2010, Torrox Costa to Antequera

Final standings

General Classification

Points Classification

King of the Mountains classification

References

2010
2010 in Spanish road cycling
2010 UCI Europe Tour